The Sarposa Prison attack was a raid on the Sarposa Prison in Kandahar, Afghanistan by Taliban insurgents on June 13, 2008. One of the largest attacks by Afghan insurgents, the raid freed 400-1000 prisoners. As of 2008, prison administration was overseen by Abdul Qabir.

Followed unrest
In May 2008, 200 prisoners announced a hunger strike and 47 of the captives physically stitched their mouths shut to protest their conditions. The strike ended when the Afghan parliament agreed to review their detentions; as some of them had been held for two years without charge, or faced summary trials they felt were unfair.

Raid
On June 13, a tanker truck approached the front gates of the prison at approximately 21:00 after nightfall and detonated explosives contained within itself, killing all Afghan police in the area. A second suicide bomber was alleged to have walked to the back gates of the prison in the confusion, and detonated explosives he was carrying himself although later reports suggested the rear wall had not been breached. Insurgents fired rockets at the prison as the Taliban fighters broke in and a 30-minute battle began.

Over the next thirty minutes, a team of thirty insurgents aboard motorcycles fired AK-47s and rocket-propelled grenades into the prison. Several ran into the prison and began freeing prisoners who fled through the breached walls, and disappeared into nearby pomegranate and grape groves.

Outcome
Wali Karzai, the brother of President Hamid Karzai who is president of Kandahar's provincial council, said the prison held about 350 suspected Taliban fighters.

He said "all" the prisoners escaped and that "There is no one left," he said. They were aided by minibuses waiting for them outside the prison during the attack. Some 390 of them were suspected Taliban fighters. Reports of people killed in the attack include:  police officers, 8 prisoners and the 2 suicide bombers.

Following reports of the mass-escape, Canadian troops stationed at Kandahar Airfield were deployed to secure the prison and ISAF troops began a door-to-door search through Kandahar seeking escapees.

Resulting conflicts 
Troops were redeployed into the area following the prison break and have been involved in skirmishes that have, as of June 17, resulted in 20 Taliban Deaths in Tabin, 16 in Khohak and Arghandab, with 2 Afghan and 4 British soldiers killed in separate incidents, which lead up to the Battle of Arghandab.

See also
Sarposa Prison tunneling escape

References

Conflicts in 2008
2008 crimes in Afghanistan
Battles of the War in Afghanistan (2001–2021)
Prisons in Afghanistan
History of Kandahar
Prison escapes
Taliban attacks
June 2008 events in Asia